Country Standard Time is a website dedicated to country music and related genres including Americana, bluegrass and rockabilly. It provides news and musical reviews pertaining to the genre. It was established in 1993 by Jeffrey B. Remz as a print magazine, which was first published only in New England but went nationwide in 1995. The magazine has had a website since 1997, and ended its print publication in January 2009.

The web site has features, news and CD, concert and book reviews and attracts about 50,000 page views per month.

References

External links
Country Standard Time

American country music
American music websites
Bluegrass music
Defunct magazines published in the United States
Magazines established in 1993
Magazines disestablished in 2009
Online music magazines published in the United States
Online magazines with defunct print editions
Magazines published in Massachusetts